Daryl Wiberg (born 1951) was a Canadian politician who served in the Legislative Assembly of Saskatchewan from 1999 to 2003, as a Saskatchewan Party member for the constituency of Saskatchewan Rivers.

References

Saskatchewan Party MLAs
1951 births
Living people
21st-century Canadian politicians